The 1944 Nebraska gubernatorial election was held on November 7, 1944, and featured incumbent Governor Dwight Griswold, a Republican, defeating Democratic nominee, busboy George W. Olsen, to win a third and final two-year term in office.

Democratic primary

Candidates
P. J. Heaton, Sidney City Attorney
George W. Olsen, busboy at Glenn L. Martin Bomber Plant cafeteria

Results

Republican primary

Candidates
William R. Brooks
Dwight Griswold, incumbent Governor

Results

General election

Results

References

Gubernatorial
1944
Nebraska
November 1944 events